Eccoptura is a genus of common stoneflies in the family Perlidae. There is at least one described species in Eccoptura, E. xanthenes. It is known as the "yellow stone" and is found in North America.

References

Further reading

 
 
 
 
 
 
 

Perlidae